Mesechthistatus is a genus of longhorn beetles of the subfamily Lamiinae, containing the following species:

 Mesechthistatus binodosus (Waterhouse, 1881)
 Mesechthistatus fujisanus Hayashi, 1957
 Mesechthistatus furciferus (Bates, 1884)
 Mesechthistatus taniguchii (Seki, 1944)

A fifth species, Mesechthistatus yamahoi  has not been recorded since the initial description of a specimen from Taiwan and its status as a species is questionable.

References

Phrissomini
Insects of Japan
Taxa named by Stephan von Breuning (entomologist)